Ævar Örn Jósepsson (born 25 August 1963 in Hafnarfjörður) is an Icelandic journalist, translator, and author.

Early life
Ævar is the youngest of four siblings. He grew up in Garðabær, Reykjavík, and in Hafnarfjörður. He moved to Akranes aged 16. From 1981-1982 he was an exchange student in Belgium. He attended the University of Stirling in Scotland, UK, from 1986-1987 and studied journalism, political science and philosophy. He then attended Albert-Ludwigs Universität in Freiburg, Germany, becoming Magister Artium of philosophy and English literature in 1994.

Career
Ævar initially worked as a fisherman, then as from 1984-1986 as a bank clerk for Landsbanki Íslands. He started doing programs for television and radio, working at RÚV radio since 1995.

He worked as a journalist for Þjóðviljinn, Morgunblaðið, visir.is, Ský and others.

Writing
Ævar has written a series of six crime novels.
Skítadjobb (2002) .
Svartir englar (2003)  (later made into a film series of the same name.)
Blóðberg (2005) .
Sá yðar sem syndlaus er (2006) .
 Land tækifæranna (2008) (nominated for the Glass Key award.) .
Önnur líf (2010) .

He has also written a short story called Línudans, published in Spannendsten Weihnachtgeschichten aus Skandinavien (2004).

See also

 List of Icelandic writers

References

1963 births
Living people
Aevar Örn Jósepsson
Aevar Örn Jósepsson
Aevar Örn Jósepsson
Aevar Örn Jósepsson